The Chautauqua Hurricane are a semiprofessional basketball team in Brocton, New York, and members of Premier Basketball League (PBL).

History
The Chautauqua Hurricane were founded in 2015 as a member of the semiprofessional American Basketball Association (ABA). The Hurricane then played the 2018 and 2019 seasons in the semiprofessional North American Basketball League (NABL) as part of a new Northeast Division.

The Hurricane announced in December 2019 that the team would return in a re-launched Premier Basketball League (PBL) for the 2020 season. The league announced the season would be put on hold due to the COVID-19 pandemic.

References

Sports in Jamestown, New York
Basketball teams in New York (state)
Premier Basketball League teams